Pornstar 2: Pangalawang Putok (stylized as #Pornstar 2: Pangalawang Putok) is  a 2021 erotic comedy film written and directed by Darryl Yap. A sequel to Paglaki Ko, Gusto Kong Maging Pornstar and produced by Vincent Del Rosario III and Veronique Del Rosario-Corpus. It stars Rosanna Roces, Alma Moreno, Ara Mina and Maui Taylor.

Cast
Rosanna Roces as herself
Alma Moreno as herself
Ara Mina as herself
Maui Taylor as herself
Lara Morena as Lara
Ayanna Misola as Trinidad/Trina
Cara Gonzales as Melchora/Melch
Stephanie Raz as Josefa/Sefa
Sab Aggabao as Gabriela/Gabby
Abed Green as Abed
Prince Salvador as Park Bojum
Jet Delgado as Isagani
Rash Flores as Rashad

Release
The film has been announced and was released on December 3, 2021, on Vivamax.

Soundtrack

 Rosas
Performed by Magnus Haven
Lyrics: Rey Maestro
Music: Magnus Haven - Rey Maestro, David Galang, Sean Michael Espejo Catalla, Louise Rafael Vaflor, Rajih Emmanuel Mendoza
Published by Blacksheep Records Manila
Produced by Robert Javier, Jaworski Garcia, David Galang
Arranged by Rey Maestro, David Galang
Recorded, mixed and mastered by Robert Javier, Jaworski Garcia, David Galang at Viva Recording Studios
Courtesy of Blacksheep Records Manila.
 Mani
Performed by Fred Panopio
Composed by Ernie de la Peña
Published by ABS-CBN Film Productions, Inc./Star Songs (BAMI)
Courtesy of Vicor Music Corporation.
 Nanggigigil
Performed by Hagibis
Composed by Mike Hanopol
Published by ABS-CBN Film Productions, Inc./Star Songs (BAMI)
Produced by Mike Hanopol, Tony Huelves
Arranged by Mike Hanopol
Courtesy of Vicor Music Corporation.
 Babae
Performed by Hagibis
Composed by Mike Hanopol
Published by ABS-CBN Film Productions, Inc./Star Songs (BAMI)
Produced by Mike Hanopol, Tony Huelves
Arranged by Mike Hanopol
Courtesy of Vicor Music Corporation.
 Lalake
Performed by Hagibis
Composed by Mike Hanopol, Tony Huelves
Published by ABS-CBN Film Productions, Inc./Star Songs (BAMI)
Courtesy of Vicor Music Corporation.
 Dale dale
Performed by Sexbomb New Generation (as SB New Gen) Feat. Cursebox
Composed by Hazel Faith Dela Cruz (as Hazel Faith), Keshia Almoroto, Jara Nakamura, and Eunice Creus (as Unise Creus)
Published by Viva Music Publishing Inc.
Produced and arranged by Cursebox (as Michael 'Cursebox' Negapatan)
Production house/studio: Cursebox Productions
Recorded, mixed and mastered by Cursebox (as Michael 'Cursebox' Negapatan)
Courtesy of Viva Records Corporation.

References

External links
• 

2020s sex comedy films
Philippine sex comedy films
Viva Films films
2020s Tagalog-language films
Philippine sequel films